Lua de Mel (English title: High Note) is a Portuguese telenovela produced by SP Televisão and broadcast by SIC. It premiered on 6 June and ended on 18 November 2022. The telenovela is written by Ana Casaca with the collaboration of Rita Roberto, António Barreira, Catarina Pereira Dias, José Pinto Carneiro and Pedro Cavaleiro. It stars Jessica Athayde, Fernando Pires, Cláudia Vieira, Carolina Loureiro, Sandra Barata Belo, Luísa Cruz, Filipa Nascimento, Ivo Lucas and Joana Aguiar.

Plot 

In this love, funny and musical story, several iconic characters of fictional universe of SIC cross paths to give a new direction to their lives.

The story starts with the main character of Nazaré with the same name, Nazaré. She lives happily with her husband and children, but sees her life suddenly turned inside out when the police accuse her of a crime she did not commit. Behind it all is Verónica. Nazaré becomes a fugitive from the police and, with the help of her faithful friend Toni, gets a fake citizen card. And it will be like Carla Isabel, her new identity, who will become a driver of the Portuguese music company of the telenovela Amor Amor, High Note.

Verónica ends up in the jail, but that situation doesn't free Nazaré. So, she's forced to running away from the police, and see their children, like Bernardo, go to the United States with Duarte to keep them safe. Only until the truth is restored. In jail, Verónica becomes Ângela's cell companion, but she is no longer the same woman. In addition to all the crimes he committed, we found out that many years ago Ângela sold his younger sister to a Portuguese couple who emigrated to South Africa.

Lili is happy with her family, until the death of her adoptive mother brings out her true origins. In an attempt to find out who she really is, Lili decides to come to Portugal, thinking that Ângela would be her sister. When she arrives in Penafiel, Lili meets Renato França, a singer with a career turned upside down and serious financial difficulties. The chemistry between the two is explosive and they spend the night together. Verónica and Ângela discover that Lili is rich and draw up a plan to take advantage of her money, inventing that she is Ângela's daughter and that she has a terminal illness. Thus, the villain asks Lili to get her out of jail and help her recover the High Note.

The High Note, which actually is in charge of Melanie, Sandra and Valentim Valério, is more than just a music company. Now, it's also a TV channel: VêVê TV, where Valentim Valério takes the opportunity to spread poison. Melanie and Leandro are a successful couple in Portuguese music. Happy as never before, they plan to expand the family, but Melanie has a hard time getting pregnant. This is where Silvie, an old friend from when she lived in Luxembourg, comes into the history. Silvie is delighted with Leandro and offers to be their surrogate. But Mel doesn't have idea the headaches that this idea will bring to her.

Sandra starts dating Zé Pedro, an ambitious guitarist who is with her just for their own advantage. His brother Xavi, who emigrated to England, but who came to spend the summer in Portugal, will truly fall in love with her, which makes him stay for Penafiel, getting work and being the head of the Erva Boa garden center.

Rebeca Sofia, now an abandoned single mother, and queen of Portuguese popular music and one of the singers of VêVê TV, where she has her own program.

Tó Quim left the firefighters once and for all and is about to inaugurate his bar on Luzim River Beach.

Cast

Introduced in season 1 
 Main cast
 Jessica Athayde as Liliana "Lili" Maia (seasons 1-2)
 Fernando Pires as Renato França (seasons 1-2)
 Cláudia Vieira as Dina Cruz (seasons 1-2)
 Carolina Loureiro as Nazaré Gomes Blanco (seasons 1-2)
 Sandra Barata Belo as Verónica Andrade Blanco  (seasons 1-2)
 Luísa Cruz as Ângela Pinto (seasons 1-2)
 Margarida Baker as Young Ângela (season 1)
 Filipa Nascimento as Melanie "Mel" Sousa Ribeiro (seasons 1-2)
 Ivo Lucas as Leandro Vieira (seasons 1-2)
 Joana Aguiar as Sandra "Sandy" Carina Pinto Pereira (seasons 1-2)

 Recurring cast
 Rodrigo Trindade as José "Zé" Pedro Martins (seasons 1-2)
 Custódia Gallego as Geraldina "Gi" Natércia Coutinho (seasons 1-2)
 Rui Mendes as Jaime Honrado (seasons 1-2)
 Lídia Franco as Gina Honrado (seasons 1-2)
 Rosa do Canto as Maria de Lurdes Sousa (season 1)
 Miguel Raposo as Augusto Gil Cruz (seasons 1-2)
 Noémia Costa as Maria Prazeres dos Anjos Pinto (seasons 1-2)
 Bruna Quintas as Alexandra "Xana" Figueiredo (seasons 1-2)
 Cecília Henriques as Gisela Torres (seasons 1-2)
 Lucas Dutra as Cristiano Cruz (seasons 1-2)
 Luciana Abreu as Rebeca Sofia Mendes (seasons 1-2)
 Fernando Rocha as António Joaquim "Tó Quim" (seasons 1-2)
 Oceana Basílio as Palmela "Pammy" Andreia (seasons 1-2)
 João Mota as Xavier "Xavi" Martins (seasons 1-2)
 Heitor Lourenço as Valentim Valério (seasons 1-2)
 Ana Bustorff as Guadalupe Ruiz (seasons 1-2)
 Rui Santos as Pablo Ruiz (seasons 1-2)
 António Camelier as Manuel "Manu" Ruiz (seasons 1-2)
 Sara Norte as Silvie Castanheira (seasons 1-2)
 Francisco Fernandes as Márcio Filipe Mendes (seasons 1-2)

 Guest characters
 Margarida Serrano as Alice Moreira (season 1)
 Rodrigo Costa as José "Zé" Pedro Gomes Blanco (season 1)
 José Mata as Duarte Blanco (season 1)
 Sara Matos as Elsa Santinho (season 1)
 Guilherme Moura as Bernardo Maria Telles Blanco (season 1)
 Afonso Pimentel as António "Toni" Silva (season 1)
 Renato Godinho as Vítor Filipe Mendes (season 1)
 António Fonseca as Raúl Santinho (season 1)

Introduced in season 2 
 Recurring cast
 Tiago Castro as Renée (season 2)

 Guest characters
 Ricardo Pereira as Romeu Santiago (season 2)
 Joana Santos as Linda Sousa (season 2)
 Miguel Costa as Rui Neves (season 2)
 Laura Dutra as Margarida Maria "Guida" Grilo (season 2)

Production 
On 19 March 2022, due to commemorations the 30th anniversary of the Portuguese television channel SIC, the telenovela has been confirmed, featuring new characters and also old characters from another telenovelas broadcast by SIC, which is focus on the music company of the telenovela Amor Amor: Lua de Mel (High Note in English). Later, Lua de Mel ended up as the title of the telenovela. In the same year, on 6 April, the first scenes were filmed in SP Televisão studios, Nazaré and Penafiel, and on 29 June, the last scenes were filmed.

Telenovela overview

Ratings 

Premiering with the purpose of raising the audiences left of its predecessor in the time slot (Amor Amor - Vol. 2 and Por Ti), Lua de Mel saw the one of the worst pilot-episode rating of the first track of telenovelas broadcast by SIC, drawing a rating of 10.8 points and audience share of 22.1%.

Since the second episode, the telenovela began to oscillate between the lead and the vice lead of the audiences and later, ending up losing completely the leader of the audiences. So, due to that and for marketing reasons, the telenovela was divided into two seasons, with the first season finale aired on September 2, 2022, drawing a rating of 7.2 points and audience share of 16.7%. Three days later, on the 5th, the second season aired, titled of ‘Temporada Final’ (Final season in English). Despite having difficulties in imposing itself at the beginning, the second season ended up leading most of the time due to having changed time with the premiere of Sangue Oculto. The second season ended on 28 November 2022, drawing a rating of 8.6 points and audience share of 17.9%.

References
Notes

Citations

External links 

2022 Portuguese television series debuts
Portuguese telenovelas
2022 telenovelas
Sociedade Independente de Comunicação telenovelas
Portuguese-language telenovelas
Television shows set in Portugal